The Nigoglia ( or) is a short Italian river whose source is at the northern end of  Lake Orta, of which it is the sole outflow. Its course of less than 2 kilometres passes in a northerly direction through the town of Omegna and into the Strona.

As a rule, the outflows of Italy's major subalpine lakes run in a southerly direction, down to the plains of the Po valley. The Nigoglia is the exception, seeming to run "upwards" towards the high Alps. This peculiarity gave rise to the motto in the local dialect which is posted on the Omegna town hall, and which is quoted at the end of Gianni Rodari's children's story :
   ("The Nigoglia runs upwards, and we make our own laws!")

Sources
This original version of this article included text translated from its counterpart in the Italian Wikipedia.

Rivers of Italy
Rivers of the Province of Verbano-Cusio-Ossola
Rivers of the Alps
Lake Orta